On February 3, 1959, American rock and roll musicians Buddy Holly, Ritchie Valens, and "The Big Bopper" J. P. Richardson were all killed in a plane crash near Clear Lake, Iowa, together with pilot Roger Peterson. The event later became known as "The Day the Music Died" after singer-songwriter Don McLean referred to it as such in his 1971 song "American Pie".

At the time, Holly and his band, consisting of Waylon Jennings, Tommy Allsup, and Carl Bunch, were playing on the "Winter Dance Party" tour across the Midwest. Rising artists Valens, Richardson, and vocal group Dion and the Belmonts had joined the tour as well. The long journeys between venues on board the cold, uncomfortable tour buses adversely affected the performers, with cases of flu and even frostbite.

After stopping at Clear Lake to perform, and frustrated by the conditions on the tour buses, Holly chose to charter a plane to reach their next venue in Moorhead, Minnesota. Richardson, suffering from flu, swapped places with Jennings, taking his seat on the plane, while Allsup lost his seat to Valens on a coin toss. Soon after takeoff, late at night and in poor, wintry weather conditions, the pilot lost control of the light aircraft, a Beechcraft Bonanza, which subsequently crashed into a cornfield, killing all four on board.

The event has since been mentioned in several songs and films. Various monuments have been erected at the crash site and in Clear Lake, where an annual memorial concert is also held at the Surf Ballroom, the venue that hosted the artists' last performances.

Background
In November 1958, Buddy Holly terminated his association with The Crickets. According to Paul Anka, Holly realized he needed to go back on tour again for two reasons: he needed cash because the Crickets' manager Norman Petty had apparently stolen money from him, and he wanted to raise funds to move to New York City to live with his new wife, María Elena Holly, who was pregnant. Holly signed up with General Artists Corporation (GAC) because "he knew they were planning a British tour and he wanted to be in on that". 

For the start of the "Winter Dance Party" tour, Holly assembled a band consisting of Waylon Jennings (bass), Tommy Allsup (guitar), and Carl Bunch (drums), with the opening vocals of Frankie Sardo. The tour was set to cover twenty-four Midwestern cities in as many daysthere were no off days. New hit artist Ritchie Valens, "The Big Bopper" J. P. Richardson, and the vocal group Dion and the Belmonts joined the tour to promote their recordings and make an extra profit.

The 1959 tour began in Milwaukee, Wisconsin, on January 23, with the performance in Clear Lake, Iowa, on February 2 being the eleventh of the twenty-four scheduled events. The amount of travel required soon became a serious problem. The distances between venues had not been properly considered when the performances were scheduled. Instead of systematically circling around the Midwest through a series of venues in close proximity to one another, the tour erratically zigzagged back and forth across the region, with distances between some tour stops exceeding . As there were no off days, the bands had to travel most of each day, frequently for ten to twelve hours in freezing mid-winter temperatures. Most of the Interstate Highway System had not yet been built, so the routes between tour stops required far more driving time on narrow two-lane rural highways than would now be the case on modern expressways. 

GAC-Super Productions, the organization that booked the tour, later received considerable criticism for their seemingly total disregard for the conditions they forced the touring musicians to endure:

The entire company of musicians traveled together in one bus, although the buses used for the tour were wholly inadequate, breaking down and being replaced frequently. Griggs estimates that five separate buses were used in the first eleven days of the tour—"reconditioned school buses, not good enough for school kids". The artists themselves were responsible for loading and unloading equipment at each stop, as no road crew assisted them. One bus had a heating system that malfunctioned shortly after the tour began, in Appleton, Wisconsin.

Later, Richardson and Valens began experiencing flu-like symptoms and drummer Bunch was hospitalized for severely frostbitten feet after the tour bus stalled in the middle of the highway in subzero temperatures near Ironwood, Michigan. The musicians replaced that bus with another school bus and kept traveling. As Holly's group had been the backing band for all of the acts, Holly, Valens and DiMucci took turns playing drums for each other at the performances in Green Bay, Wisconsin, and Clear Lake, Iowa, with Holly playing drums for Dion, Dion playing drums for Ritchie, and Ritchie playing drums for Holly.

On Monday, February 2, the tour arrived in Clear Lake, west of Mason City, having driven  from the previous day's concert in Green Bay, Wisconsin. The town in northern Iowa had not been a scheduled stop; tour promoters hoped to fill the open date and called the manager of the local Surf Ballroom, Carroll Anderson (1920–2006), and offered him the show. Anderson accepted and they set the show for that night. By the time Holly arrived at the venue that evening, he was frustrated with the ongoing problems with the bus. The next scheduled destination after Clear Lake was Moorhead, Minnesota, a  drive north-northwest—and, as a reflection of the poor quality of the tour planning, a journey that would have taken them directly back through the two towns they had already played within the last week. No let-up after that was in sight, as the following day after having traveled from Iowa to Minnesota, they were scheduled to travel right back to Iowa, specifically almost directly south to Sioux City, a  trip.

Holly chartered a plane to fly himself and his band to Fargo, North Dakota, which is adjacent to Moorhead. The rest of the party would have picked him up in Moorhead, saving him the journey in the bus and leaving him time to get some rest. Their gig in Moorhead was to have been a radio performance at the station KFGO with disk jockey Charlie Boone.

Flight arrangements

Anderson called Hubert Jerry Dwyer (1930–2016), owner of the Dwyer Flying Service in Mason City, to charter the plane to fly to Fargo's Hector Airport, the closest one to Moorhead. Flight arrangements were made with Roger Peterson, a 21-year-old local pilot described as a "young married man who built his life around flying".

The flying service charged a fee of $36 per passenger for the flight on the 1947 single-engined, V-tailed Beechcraft 35 Bonanza (registration ), which seated three passengers and the pilot. A popular misconception, originating from Don McLean's song about the crash, was that the plane was called American Pie; no record exists of any name ever having been given to N3794N.

The most widely accepted version of events was that Richardson had contracted the flu during the tour and asked Jennings for his seat on the plane. When Holly learned that Jennings was not going to fly, he said in jest: "Well, I hope your damned bus freezes up." Jennings responded: "Well, I hope your ol' plane crashes", a humorous but ill-fated response that haunted him for the rest of his life. Valens, who once had a fear of flying, asked Allsup for his seat on the plane. The two agreed to toss a coin to decide. Bob Hale, a disc jockey with Mason City's KRIB-AM, was emceeing the concert that night and flipped the coin in the ballroom's side-stage room shortly before the musicians departed for the airport. Valens won the coin toss for the seat on the flight. Valens is apocryphally said to have remarked, "That's the first time I've ever won anything in my life."

In contradiction to the testimony of Allsup and Jennings, Dion has since said that Holly approached him along with Valens and Richardson to join the flight, not Holly's bandmates. In a 2009 interview, Dion said that Holly called him, Valens, and Richardson into a vacant dressing room during Sardo's performance and said, "I've chartered a plane, we're the guys making the money [we should be the ones flying ahead]...the only problem is there are only two available seats." According to Dion, it was Valens, not Richardson, who had fallen ill, so Valens and Dion flipped a coin for the seat. In his interview, no mention is made of Jennings or Allsup being invited on the plane. Dion said he won the toss, but ultimately decided that since the $36 fare (equivalent to $ in ) equaled the monthly rent his parents paid for his childhood apartment, he could not justify the indulgence.

Take-off and crash

After the show ended, Anderson drove Holly, Valens, and Richardson to nearby Mason City Municipal Airport, where the elevation is  AMSL. Although deteriorating weather was reported along the planned route, the weather briefings Peterson received failed to relay the information.

The plane took off normally from runway 17 (today's runway 18) at 00:55 (12:55 am) CST on Tuesday, February 3. Dwyer witnessed the southbound take-off from a platform outside the control tower. He was able to clearly see the aircraft's tail light for most of the brief flight, which started with an initial 180 degree left turn to pass east of the airport, climbing to approximately  AGL. After an additional left turn to a northwesterly heading, the tail light was then observed gradually descending until it disappeared. Around 01:00 (1:00 am), when Peterson failed to make the expected radio contact, repeated attempts to establish communication were made, at Dwyer's request, by the radio operator, but they were all unsuccessful.

Later that morning, Dwyer, having heard no word from Peterson since his departure, took off in another airplane to retrace Peterson's planned route. The sheriff's office, alerted by Dwyer, dispatched Deputy Bill McGill, who drove to the crash site, a cornfield belonging to Albert Juhl.

The bodies of Holly and Valens had been ejected from the fuselage and lay near the plane's wreckage. Richardson's body had been thrown over the fence and into the cornfield of Juhl's neighbor Oscar Moffett, while Peterson's body was entangled in the wreckage. With the rest of the entourage en route to Minnesota, Anderson, who had driven the party to the airport and witnessed the plane's takeoff, had to identify the bodies of the musicians. County coroner Ralph Smiley certified that all four victims died instantly, citing the cause of death as "gross trauma to brain" for the three artists and "brain damage" for the pilot.

Aftermath

María Elena Holly learned of her husband's death via a television news report. A widow after only six months of marriage, she suffered a miscarriage shortly after, reportedly due to "psychological trauma". Holly's mother, on hearing the news on the radio at home in Lubbock, Texas, screamed and collapsed. Within months of Holly's death, official protocols were implemented to ensure that the names of victims of traumatic incidents are not released by authorities until after their families have been notified.

Despite the tragedy, the "Winter Dance Party" tour continued. Fifteen-year-old Bobby Vee was given the task of filling in for Holly at the next scheduled performance in Moorhead, in part because he "knew all the words to all the songs". Jennings and Allsup carried on for two more weeks, with Jennings taking Holly's place as lead singer.

Meanwhile, funerals for the victims were held individually. Holly and Richardson were buried in Texas, Valens in California, and Peterson in Iowa. Holly's widow, María Elena, did not attend the funeral. She later said in an interview: "In a way, I blame myself. I was not feeling well when he left. I was two weeks pregnant, and I wanted Buddy to stay with me, but he had scheduled that tour. It was the only time I wasn't with him. And I blame myself because I know that, if only I had gone along, Buddy never would have gotten into that airplane."

Official investigation
The official investigation was carried out by the Civil Aeronautics Board (CAB, precursor to the NTSB). It emerged that Peterson had over four years of flying experience, of which one was with Dwyer Flying Service, and had accumulated 711 flying hours, of which 128 were on Bonanzas. He had also logged 52 hours of instrument flight training, although he had passed only his written examination, and was not yet qualified to operate in weather that required flying solely by reference to instruments. Peterson and Dwyer Flying Service itself were certified to operate only under visual flight rules, which essentially require that the pilot must be able to see where he is going. However, on the night of the accident, visual flight would have been virtually impossible due to the low clouds, the lack of a visible horizon, and the absence of ground lights over the sparsely populated area.

Furthermore, Peterson, who had failed an instrument checkride nine months before the accident, had received his instrument training on airplanes equipped with a conventional artificial horizon as a source of aircraft altitude information, while N3794N was equipped with an older-type Sperry F3 attitude gyroscope. Crucially, the two types of instruments display the same aircraft pitch attitude information in graphically opposite ways. 

Another contributing factor was the "seriously inadequate" weather briefing provided to Peterson, which "failed to even mention adverse flying conditions which should have been highlighted". The CAB concluded that the probable cause of the accident was "the pilot's unwise decision" to attempt a flight that required skills he did not have.

Subsequent investigations
On March 6, 2007, in Beaumont, Texas, Richardson's body was exhumed for reburial. This was due to the Recorded Texas Historic Landmark being awarded to the Big Bopper's original grave site, where a bronze statue would subsequently be erected. Forest Lawn cemetery did not allow above-ground monuments at that specific site, and Richardson's body was moved at the cemetery's expense to a more suitable area. As the body was to be placed in a new casket while above ground, the musician's son, Jay Perry Richardson, took the opportunity to have his father's body re-examined to verify the original coroner's findings and asked forensic anthropologist William M. Bass to carry out the procedure. A longstanding rumor surrounding the accident, which this re-examination sought to confirm or dispel, asserted that an accidental firearm discharge took place on board the aircraft and caused the crash. Another longstanding theory surmised that Richardson initially survived the crash and subsequently crawled out of the wreckage in search of help before succumbing to his injuries, prompted by the fact that his body was found farther from the plane than the other victims. Bass and his team took several X-rays of Richardson's body and eventually concluded that the musician had indeed died instantly from extensive, unsurvivable fractures to virtually every bone in his body. No traces of lead were found from any bullet, nor any indication that he had been shot. Coroner Smiley's original 1959 report was, therefore, confirmed as accurate.

In March 2015, the National Transportation Safety Board (NTSB) received a request to reopen the investigation into the accident. The request was made by L. J. Coon, a retired pilot from New England who felt that the conclusion of the 1959 investigation was inaccurate. Coon suspected a possible failure of the right ruddervator, or a problem with the fuel system, as well as possible improper weight distribution. Coon also argued that Peterson may have tried to land the plane and that his efforts should be recognized. The NTSB declined the request in April 2015, saying that the evidence presented by Coon was insufficient to merit the reconsideration of the original findings.

Legacy

Notification of victims' families
Following the miscarriage suffered by Holly's wife and the circumstances in which she was informed of his death, a policy was later adopted by authorities not to disclose victims' names until after their families have been informed.

Memorials
A memorial service for Peterson was held at Redeemer Lutheran Church in Ventura, Iowa, on February 5. A funeral was held the next day at St. Paul Lutheran Church in his hometown of Alta; Peterson was buried in Buena Vista Memorial Cemetery in nearby Storm Lake.

Films
 The accident closes the biographical film The Buddy Holly Story (1978); the film ends as the Clear Lake concert concludes, and a freeze-frame shot is followed with a caption revealing their deaths later that night "...and the rest is Rock 'N Roll."
 The run-up to the accident and its aftermath, particularly the reactions of Ritchie Valens' immediate family and loved ones, are also depicted in the Valens biopic La Bamba (1987).

Memorial concerts
Fans of Holly, Valens, and Richardson have been gathering for annual memorial concerts at the Surf Ballroom in Clear Lake since 1979. The fiftieth anniversary concert took place on February 2, 2009, with Delbert McClinton, Joe Ely, Wanda Jackson, Los Lobos, Chris Montez, Bobby Vee, Graham Nash, Peter and Gordon, Tommy Allsup, and a house band featuring Chuck Leavell, James "Hutch" Hutchinson, Bobby Keys, and Kenny Aronoff. Jay Perry Richardson, the son of the Big Bopper, was among the participating artists, and Bob Hale was the master of ceremonies, as he was at the 1959 concert.

Monuments

In 1989, Ken Paquette, a Wisconsin fan of the 1950s era, made a stainless-steel monument that depicts a guitar and a set of three records bearing the names of the three performers killed in the accident. At that intersection, a large plasma-cut steel set of Wayfarer-style glasses, similar to those Holly wore, marks the access point to the crash site.

Paquette also created a similar stainless-steel monument to the three musicians located outside the Riverside Ballroom in Green Bay, Wisconsin, where Holly, Richardson, and Valens played their penultimate show on February 1. This second memorial was unveiled on July 17, 2003. In February 2009, a further memorial made by Paquette for Peterson was unveiled at the crash site.

Roads
A road originating near the Surf Ballroom, extending north and passing to the west of the crash site, is now known as Buddy Holly Place.

Songs

 Tommy Dee recorded "Three Stars" (1959), commemorating the musicians.
 In 1961, Mike Berry recorded "Tribute to Buddy Holly", which describes the night of the flight. It reached number 24 on the UK Singles Chart and was notoriously banned by the BBC for being "too morbid".
 Don McLean, a fan of Buddy Holly, later addressed the accident in his song "American Pie" (1971), dubbing it "the Day the Music Died", which for McLean symbolized the "loss of innocence" of the early rock-and-roll generation.
 In 1978, Waylon Jennings briefly added his own memories of the incident onto his song "A Long Time Ago", from the album I've Always Been Crazy. He sings the lines "Don’t ask me who I gave my seat to on that plane, I think you already know, I told you that a long time ago."
 Dion recorded "Hug My Radiator" which references the "broken-down bus" and the chilling cold the performers experienced on the tour. The song does not directly reference the three performers who died, but Dion has said, in interviews, that the song is a memory of the tour and that he also almost got on the airplane that crashed, but it was too expensive.

Fiction
Howard Waldrop's short story "Save a Place in the Lifeboat for Me" (collected in Howard Who?) describes a fictional attempt by a sextet of famous slapstick characters to prevent the accident from occurring.

See also
 List of music group fatalities from aviation accidents
 Continued VFR into IMC

Notes

References

Citations

Web

Books

Further reading

External links

 February 3, 1959 front page of the Mason City Globe-Gazette, via Newspapers.com 
 fiftiesweb.com The Day the Music Died
 Bakotopia Magazine's 50th Anniversary memorial article
 1959: Buddy Holly killed in air crash
 Voices of Oklahoma interview with Tommy Allsup. First person interview conducted with Tommy Allsup on September 8, 2011. Original audio and transcript archived with Voices of Oklahoma oral history project.
The true Buddy Holly history, Dion DiMucci's recollections of the tour and the accident, at his official YouTube channel 

1959 in American music
1959 in Iowa
1971 neologisms
Cerro Gordo County, Iowa
Aviation accidents and incidents in the United States in 1959
Aviation accidents and incidents in Iowa
Aviation accidents and incidents caused by pilot error
Accidents and incidents involving the Beechcraft Bonanza
Buddy Holly
February 1959 events in the United States
Quotations from music
Ritchie Valens